Mount Clarence Wyckoff ( or Clarence Wyckoff Bjerg) is a mountain in Peary Land, Northern Greenland. Administratively the mountain belongs to the Northeast Greenland National Park.

The peak was named after Clarence F. Wyckoff, one of the members of the Peary Arctic Club in New York.

The Wyckoff Bjerg Formation is named after the mountain. Fossils dating back to the Cambrian have been found in it.

Geography

See also
List of fossiliferous stratigraphic units in Greenland
List of mountains in Greenland
Herluf Trolle Land

References

External links
Boreal Ties: Part II
Geological and structural map of eastern Peary Land
Wyckoff
Peary Land